What Made Her Do It? is a 1930 Japanese silent film directed by Shigeyoshi Suzuki, based on the Shingeki play. It was the top-grossing Japanese film of the silent era. Notable as an example of a so-called "tendency film" with strong anti-capitalist themes, the film inspired a riot in its showing in Tokyo's Asakusa district with media reports of riots in other cities.

Plot
The plot centers on a schoolgirl, Sumiko (Keiko Takatsu) who has been sent to live with her uncle. Arriving to a harried household with many children, her aunt and alcoholic uncle are annoyed by her arrival. A note, which Sumiko cannot read, announces that her father has killed himself. After being denied schooling and placed into labor for the family, Sumiko is eventually sold to a circus where she suffers at the hands of its members and ringmaster. Sumiko escapes with another circus performer, Shintaro (Ryuujin Unno), but Sumiko joins a team of thieves and ends up arrested. She is given work in the home of a wealthy aristocratic family, who denies even the simplest of pleasures to their staff out of cruelty. She is sent to a Christian orphanage, where she is humiliated for writing a letter to an old friend, and must make a public speech renouncing her ways and accepting Christ into her heart. Given the opportunity, Sumiko instead denounces the church, and ends up burning it down.

Cast

Keiko Takatsu as Nakamura Sumiko
Rintarō Fujima as Hiroshi Hasegawa
Ryuujin Unno as Shintaro
Yōyō Kojima 
Hidekatsu Maki
Itaru Hamada
Takashi Asano
Saburō Oono

Restoration
The film, thought to be lost after World War II, was restored in 1997 from a partial print found in the Russian Gosfilmosfond archive in 1994. The restoration added title cards approximating what was known of missing scenes, based on a copy of the director's screenplay provided by his family. These notes were added to the start and finish of the film under supervision of Ota Yoneo.

Reception
While contemporary criticism of the film includes film historian Donald Richie's perspective that the film is "a melodramatic potboiler," the film was a box-office success that lead to increased scrutiny and eventually government censorship of political messaging in films of the era. The film has been compared to radical German theater and Soviet-era propaganda films, though made by a commercial studio which embraced a tendency toward melodrama and vulgarity.

References

1930 films
Japanese black-and-white films
Japanese silent films